Anjanadoria is a town and commune in Madagascar. It belongs to the district of Ambohidratrimo (district), which is a part of Analamanga Region. About 60 km north of the capital Antananarivo, its population was estimated to be approximately 7,602.

References and notes 

Populated places in Analamanga